Mark David Lewis (born November 30, 1969) is an American former professional baseball infielder who played in Major League Baseball (MLB) for the Cleveland Indians, Cincinnati Reds, Detroit Tigers, San Francisco Giants, Philadelphia Phillies, and Baltimore Orioles.

Stats
Lewis amassed 48 home runs, 306 RBI and a .263 batting average over 902 games of major league play. A large majority of his home runs came between 1996 and 1999. During those four years he hit 36 home runs (11, 10, 9, and 6, respectively). He did not hit a single home run as a rookie for the Indians in more than 300 at bats. His career highlight may have occurred in Game 3 of the 1995 National League Division Series when as a member of the Cincinnati Reds, playing against the Los Angeles Dodgers, he hit the first pinch-hit grand slam in postseason history.

After the  season, Lewis became a free agent, ending his major league career at the age of 31.

External links

Mark Lewis at Baseball Gauge

Major League Baseball infielders
1969 births
Living people
Cleveland Indians players
Cincinnati Reds players
Detroit Tigers players
San Francisco Giants players
Philadelphia Phillies players
Baltimore Orioles players
Baseball players from Ohio
Sportspeople from Hamilton, Ohio
Burlington Indians players (1986–2006)
Kinston Indians players
Canton-Akron Indians players
Colorado Springs Sky Sox players
Charlotte Knights players
Buffalo Bisons (minor league) players
Long Island Ducks players